Eupogonesthes xenicus, the Exotic snaggletooth, is a species of barbeled dragonfish found in the eastern Indian Ocean.  This species grows to a length of  SL. This species is the only known species in its genus.

References
 

Stomiidae
Fish described in 1993